Watch Your Mouth may refer to:
 Watch Your Mouth (novel), a 2000 novel by Daniel Handler
 Watch Your Mouth (TV series), a 1978 American comedy-drama television series